The PalaTriccoli (officially ), also known as UBI BPA Sport Center (due to sponsorship reasons), is an indoor sporting arena located in Jesi, Italy.

It was the home venue of women's volleyball club Vini Monteschiavo Jesi during the period it played in the Serie A1 from 2001 to 2010. It is the home venue of basketball club Aurora Basket Jesi since 1992 and has capacity for 3,500 spectators.

In April 2015, the venue was renamed  after a sponsorship deal was agreed.

References

Indoor arenas in Italy
Volleyball venues in Italy
Iesi
Buildings and structures in the Province of Ancona
Sports venues in Marche